Conus sugimotonis is a species of sea snail, a marine gastropod mollusk in the family Conidae, the cone snails and their allies.

Like all species within the genus Conus, these snails are predatory and venomous. They are capable of "stinging" humans, therefore live ones should be handled carefully or not at all.

Description
The size of the shell varies between 50 mm and 114 mm.

Distribution
This marine species occurs off Japan, Taiwan, the Philippines, in the Coral Sea and off Australia (Queensland).

References

 Kuroda, T. 1928. Two families new to the Mollusca fauna of Japan. Venus 1: 10–14, pl. 1
 Lan, T.C. 1978. Two new cones from NE off Taiwan and the Philippines. Bulletin of Malacology, Republic of China 5: 65–67
 Motta, A.J. da 1985. Two new Conus species. La Conchiglia 17(190-191): 26–28
 Wilson, B. 1994. Australian Marine Shells. Prosobranch Gastropods. Kallaroo, WA : Odyssey Publishing Vol. 2 370 pp.
 Röckel, D., Korn, W. & Kohn, A.J. 1995. Manual of the Living Conidae. Volume 1: Indo-Pacific Region. Wiesbaden : Hemmen 517 pp. 
 Tucker J.K. & Tenorio M.J. (2013) Illustrated catalog of the living cone shells. 517 pp. Wellington, Florida: MdM Publishing.
 Puillandre N., Duda T.F., Meyer C., Olivera B.M. & Bouchet P. (2015). One, four or 100 genera? A new classification of the cone snails. Journal of Molluscan Studies. 81: 1–23

External links
 The Conus Biodiversity website
 Cone Shells – Knights of the Sea
 

sugimotonis
Gastropods described in 1928